The 1992–93 New York Islanders season was the 21st season in franchise history. This involved the Islanders participating in the Prince of Wales Conference finals. This would be the Islanders last playoff series win until 2016.

Offseason

NHL Draft

Regular season
Four Islanders (Benoit Hogue, Derek King, Steve Thomas and Pierre Turgeon) reached the 30-goal plateau. The team was the least penalized team during the regular season, being shorthanded only 375 times. The Islanders also tied the Boston Bruins and Washington Capitals for the fewest short-handed goals allowed during the regular season, with just 8.

Season standings

Schedule and results

Player statistics

Note: Pos = Position; GP = Games played; G = Goals; A = Assists; Pts = Points; +/- = plus/minus; PIM = Penalty minutes; PPG = Power-play goals; SHG = Short-handed goals; GWG = Game-winning goals
      MIN = Minutes played; W = Wins; L = Losses; T = Ties; GA = Goals-against; GAA = Goals-against average; SO = Shutouts; SA = Shots against; SV = Shots saved; SV% = Save percentage;

Playoffs

Patrick Division Semi-finals

Washington vs. New York Islanders

Game 6 of this series was marred by a vicious check on the Islanders' leading scorer, Pierre Turgeon, by the Capitals' Dale Hunter, moments after Turgeon scored a third-period goal to put the game and the series out of reach for Washington. Hunter received a 21-game suspension for the hit, which carried over into the 1993–94 season.
 April 18 - New York Islanders 1 Washington 3
 April 20 - New York Islanders 5 Washington 4 (2OT)
 April 22 - Washington 3 New York Islanders 4 (OT)
GWG: Ray Ferraro
 April 24 - Washington 3 New York Islanders 4 (2OT)
 April 26 - New York Islanders 4 Washington 6
 April 28 - Washington 3 New York Islanders 5

NYI win best-of-seven series 4–2

Patrick Division Finals

Pittsburgh vs. New York Islanders

The Isles' improbable upset of the Penguins was capped off by David Volek's series-winning goal at 5:16 of overtime in Game 7.
 May 2 - New York Islanders 3 Pittsburgh 2
 May 4 - New York Islanders 0 Pittsburgh 3
 May 6 - Pittsburgh 3 New York Islanders 1
 May 8 - Pittsburgh 5 New York Islanders 6
 May 10 - New York Islanders 3 Pittsburgh 6
 May 12 - Pittsburgh 5 New York Islanders 7
 May 14 - New York Islanders 4 Pittsburgh 3 (OT)

New York Islanders win best-of-seven series 4–3

Prince of Wales Conference Finals

Montreal vs. New York Islanders

All teams in the Conference Finals were seeded third in their division.

Montreal's win in game three was their eleventh straight, tying the single-playoff record set a year earlier by Pittsburgh and Chicago.
 May 16 - New York Islanders 1 Montreal 4
 May 18 - New York Islanders 3 Montreal 4 (2OT)
 May 20 - Montreal 2 New York Islanders 1 (OT)
 May 22 - Montreal 1 New York Islanders 4
 May 24 - New York Islanders 2 Montreal 5

Montreal wins best-of-seven series 4–1

Awards and records
 Lady Byng Memorial Trophy: Pierre Turgeon
 Vladimir Malakhov, Defense, NHL All-Rookie Team

References
 Islanders on Hockey Database

New York Islanders seasons
New York Islanders
New York Islanders
New York Islanders
New York Islanders